State Route 53 (SR 53) is a north–south state highway that traverses six counties in Middle Tennessee.

Route description

Coffee County

As a primary route, SR 53 begins at the junction with US 41/SR 2 in the Coffee County seat of Manchester. It goes northeast as a 4-lane undivided highway (as Woodbury Highway) through a business district before it intersects I-24 (Exit 110) before leaving town, narrowing to 2-lanes and continuing north into farmland. It has an intersection with SR 280 before crossing into Cannon County.

Cannon County

SR 53 continues through farmland (as Jim Cummings Highway) and has an intersection with SR 281 before curving through a gap between two ridges to enter Woodbury (as S McCrary Street). It goes through downtown to intersect and become concurrent with US 70S/SR 1 (Main Street) as the turn east and leave downtown before SR 53 splits off and turns north again (as Gassaway Road), leaving Woodbury and crossing the East Fork of the Stones River. SR 53 continues north through the mountains and treacherous terrain of the Highland Rim, as at this it becomes narrow and curvy, before crossing into DeKalb County, just after passing through the community of Gassaway.

DeKalb County

SR 53 continues through mountains (as Woodbury Highway) before leveling and straightening out just before entering Liberty and becoming concurrent with US 70/SR 26/SR 96 (Nashville Highway). They turn west as a 4-lane undivided highway, with SR 96 splitting off to the southwest shortly afterwards. The highway then narrows to 2-lanes as they leave Liberty and pass through hilly countryside before entering Alexandria. SR 53 then separates from US 70/SR 26 and bypasses downtown to the east (as SR 53 bypass) before leaving Alexandria (as Alexandria Highway) and continuing north to cross into Smith County.

Smith County

SR 53 immediately enters and passes through Brush Creek before continuing north through farmland to enter New Middleton and become concurrent with SR 141, just south of its interchange with I-40 (Exit 254). They turn east (as New Middleton Highway) through New Middleton, and running parallel to I-40, before entering Gordonsville (as E Main Street). The highway is briefly signed as a secondary route from the first junction with SR 141 to the second one in Gordonsville. They then intersect with SR 264, where SR 141 continues along that route to downtown and SR 53 splits off and goes north again (as Gordonsville Highway) changes back to a primary route prior to intersecting I-40 (Exit 258) before leaving Gordonsville and continuing north through farmland to an interchange with US 70N/SR 24/SR 25 at South Carthage.

Here, SR 53 turns east to run concurrently with US 70N/SR 24 (as Cookeville Highway) while SR 25 goes north as a 4-lane divided highway into Carthage. From here all the way to the Kentucky state line, the entire remainder of the SR 53 corridor  parallels the Cumberland River. They pass through farmland, crossing a bridge over the Caney Fork River and having an intersection with SR 264 until the highway reaches Chestnut Mound. SR 53 then splits off from US 70N/SR 24 and once again becomes a secondary route as it becomes narrow and curvy due to entering mountains again as it crosses into Jackson County.

Jackson County

SR 53 continues north through hilly terrain (as Granville Highway) as a narrow and curvy road as it leaves Chestnut mound and crosses a bridge over an arm of Cordell Hull Lake/Cumberland River to enter Granville, where it passes right through downtown and meets the eastern end of SR 96. It then leaves Granville and crosses another arm of Cordell Hull Lake/Cumberland River to east and continue through hilly terrain. The highway then turns north again at an intersection with SR 290 and becomes much curvier. It continues to an intersection with SR 262, where it becomes W Hull Avenue as it enters Gainesboro. SR 53 the passes through downtown before becoming concurrent with SR 56, where it returns to being a primary highway. They travel north (as Grundy Quarles Highway) to just south of SR 56's crossing of the Cumberland River, SR 53 splits off to the east and becomes concurrent with SR 85 and SR 135 (as N Grundy Quarles Highway). SR 135 splits off a short distance later just before crossing a bridge over the Roaring River, with SR 85 splitting off shortly afterwards. SR 53 then continues further north along the banks of the Cumberland River into Clay County.

Clay County

SR 53 continues along the banks of the Cumberland River (as Gainesboro Highway), surrounded by mountains on either side and farmland along the river banks. It then has an intersection with SR 292 before entering Celina. In Celina, it bypasses downtown to the east and intersects with SR 52.

After it passes through Celina, SR 53 goes in a northeasterly direction, over the Obey River, skirting the banks of Dale Hollow Lake until it reaches its northern terminus at the Kentucky state line. The road continues as Kentucky Route 61 upon entering Cumberland County, Kentucky.

History
The highway in Clay County passed through the town of Willow Grove until the town's destruction in 1943 with the creation of the Dale Hollow Reservoir. The highway's entry to the town is now the site of Cedar Hill Marina. The town's destruction caused Highway 53 to be rerouted north following the shore of the new lake. The former route east of Dale Hollow is now signed as Tennessee State Route 325.

The route in Smith County has been rebuilt multiple times, too. The concurrency with State Route 24 previously went from the center of South Carthage to the eastern end of Chestnut Mound, as State Route 53 followed what are now South Main Street in South Carthage and parts of Enigma Road in Enigma. Eventually, bypasses of South Carthage and Enigma were built following the current route of S.R. 53, and part of the initial route of Enigma Road was flooded by a shallow bay of Cordell Hull Reservoir. The current route from New Middleton to Alexandria via Brush Creek is also not the original route.

Additional information of the route 
SR 53 from Gainesboro to Celina, and the corridor from Celina to the Kentucky state line is considered to be parts of the Corridor J-1 and J projects, respectively, of the Appalachian Development Highway System. KY 61 north of the state line continues Corridor J into Kentucky.

Major intersections

References

053
Transportation in Coffee County, Tennessee
Transportation in Cannon County, Tennessee
Transportation in DeKalb County, Tennessee
Transportation in Smith County, Tennessee
Transportation in Jackson County, Tennessee
Transportation in Clay County, Tennessee